A Summer by the River is a 1998 Finnish film written and directed by Markku Pölönen. The film is set in the 1950s Eastern Finland and tells the story of father Tenho (Pertti Koivula) and son Topi (Simo Kontio) after Tenho's wife — Topi's mother — dies and leaves the two men unable to pay rent. The two men move out of the family home and spend the summer working as lumberjacks in log driving, sleeping on the river bank and growing closer together through the experience.

The film was a major success at the 1999 Jussi Awards winning in five categories including Best Film, Best Actor and Best Direction. The film was selected as the Finnish entry for the Best Foreign Language Film at the 71st Academy Awards, but was not accepted as a nominee.

Cast and characters
 Pertti Koivula — Tenho
 Simo Kontio — Topi
 Esko Nikkari — Hannes
 Anu Palevaara — Hilkka
 Peter Franzén — Kottarainen

See also
 1998 in film
 Cinema of Finland
 List of Finnish films: 1990s
 List of submissions to the 71st Academy Awards for Best Foreign Language Film
 List of Finnish submissions for the Academy Award for Best Foreign Language Film

References

External links
 

1998 films
Finnish comedy-drama films
1990s Finnish-language films
Films directed by Markku Pölönen